Shannon Hylton (born 19 December 1996) is an English sprinter. She represented her country at the 2017 World Championships narrowly missing the semifinals.

Hylton qualified for the World Championships as the British 200m champion, having taken the title at the British Athletics Team Trials in July 2017, with a time of 22.94. Hylton also won gold in the 2015 British Indoor Athletics Championships and took gold as part of the 4 x 100m relay team at the European Junior Championships in Sweden in 2015 and also as part of the 4 x 100m relay team at the 2018 Athletics World Cup. Shannon's personal best over 200m is 22.78.

Her twin sister Cheriece Hylton is also a sprinter.

Personal life

Hylton grew up in Chislehurst, London, England and attended Bullers Wood School for Girls in Chislehurst, where she took A Levels in biology, chemistry and economics. 
She is currently studying for a Biomedical Science degree at the University of East London (UEL), where she regularly participates in debating groups focusing on women's empowerment and equal opportunities for women. Shannon admits that she enjoys the busy balance of managing her sporting endeavours with her education [5].

Career

Hylton is a member of Blackheath and Bromley Harriers Athletic Club and is coached by John Blackie who is also coach to Dina Asher-Smith. Previously she was coached by Ryan Freckleton.

In 2013, she came 6th at the World Youth Championships, in 2014, she came 4th at the World Junior Championships and then in 2015, she became European Junior Championships silver medallist. In 2015, she also won gold in the 2015 British Indoor Athletics Championships with a time of 23.69, beating her sister into second place, and was part of the gold medal-winning 4 x 100m relay team at the European Junior Championships in Sweden.

Hylton was injured in 2016, taking time off to recuperate.

In July 2017, Hylton returned to form, running a lifetime best time at the British Athletics Team Trials at the Alexander Stadium in Birmingham of 22.94 seconds, beating Bianca Williams who took the runner-up spot in 23.05 seconds.
 
Hylton was crowned British champion, qualifying for the 2017 World Championships which took place at the Olympic Stadium in London. Hylton was also selected for the 4x100m relay squad alongside Blackheath and Bromley teammate, Dina Asher-Smith, Desiree Henry, Daryll Neita, Asha Philip and fellow UEL students, Corinne Humphreys and Bianca Williams.

Hylton ran a time of 23.39 in her heat at the World Championships, which meant she narrowly missed out on a place in the semi-finals.

Hylton is a British Athletics Power of 10 athlete. Hylton, along with her sister Cheriece, has been selected to be represented by Andy Murray's management agency, 77 Sports Management. She is sponsored by Under Armour.

2018 Season

Following on from a difficult 2017, Hylton achieved some success in the 2018 outdoor season. She finished first in the 100m at the Bedford U23 Championships, improving her personal best to 11.44.

Hylton was narrowly pipped to fourth position in the 200m at the Muller British Athletics Championships in Birmingham at the beginning of July by just one thousandth of a second. Although bitterly disappointed, she did record a new personal best of 22.78.

During the inaugural London Athletics World Cup, Hylton triumphed in the 4 x 100m relay with teammates Asha Philip, Bianca Williams and Imani Lansiquot, running a time of 42.52. This victory helped secure Britain a third place at the Championships.

International competitions

Personal bests

Outdoor
100 metres – 11.44 (+0.3 m/s, Bedford 2018)
200 metres – 22.73 (+2.0 m/s, Eskilstuna 2015)

Indoor
60 metres – 7.37 (Sheffield 2017)
200 metres – 23.24 (Sheffield 2014)

References

1996 births
Living people
English female sprinters
British female sprinters
Place of birth missing (living people)
World Athletics Championships athletes for Great Britain
British Athletics Championships winners
Athletes from London